Research has shown nanoparticles to be a groundbreaking tool for tackling many arising global issues, the agricultural industry being no exception. In general, a nanoparticle is defined as any particle where one characteristic dimension is 100nm or less. Because of their unique size, these particles begin to exhibit properties that their larger counterparts may not. Due to their scale, quantum mechanical interactions become more important than classic mechanical forces, allowing for the prevalence of unique physical and chemical properties due to their extremely high surface-to-body ratio. Properties such as cation exchange capacity, enhanced diffusion, ion adsorption, and complexation are enhanced when operating at nanoscale.

This is primarily the consequence of a high proportion of atoms being present on the surface, with an increased proportion of sites operating at higher reactivities with respect to processes such as adsorption processes and electrochemical interactions. Nanoparticles are promising candidates for implementation in agriculture. Because many organic functions such as ion exchange and plant gene expression operate on small scales, nanomaterials offer a toolset that works at just the right scale to provide efficient, targeted delivery to living cells.
Current areas of focus of nanotechnology development in the agricultural industry include development of environmentally conscious nanofertilizers to provide efficient ion, nutrient delivery into plant cells, and plant gene transformations to produce plants with desirable genes such as drought resistance and accelerated growth cycles. With the global population on the rise, it is necessary to make advancements in sustainable farming methods that generate higher yields in order to meet the rising food demand. However, it must be done without generating long-term consequences such as depletion of arable land or water sources, toxic runoff, or bioaccumulative toxicity. In order to meet these demands, research is being done into the incorporation of nanotechnology agriculture.

Nano-fertilizers

One area of active research in this field is the use of nanofertilizers. Because of the aforementioned special properties of nanoparticles, nanofertilizers can be tuned to have specialized delivery to plants. Conventional fertilizers can be dangerous to the environment because of the sheer amount of runoff that stems from their use. Having a detrimental effect on everything from water quality to air particulate matter, being able to negate runoff from agriculture is extremely important for improving quality of life around the world for millions. For example, runoff from sugar plantations in Florida has spawned the infamous algae bloom called "red tide" in water tributaries across the state, creating respiratory issues in humans and killing vital ecosystems for years.

Studies have shown that, in most cases, greater than 50% of the amount of fertilizer applied to soil is lost to the environment, in some cases up to 90%. As mentioned before, this poses extremely negative environmental implications, while also demonstrating the high waste associated with conventional fertilizers. On the other hand, nanofertilizers are able to amend this issue because of their high absorption efficiency into the targeted plant- which is owed to their remarkably high surface area to volume ratios. In a study done on the use of phosphorus nano-fertilizers, absorption efficiencies of up to 90.6% were achieved, making them a highly desirable fertilizer material. Another beneficial aspect of using nanofertilizers is the ability to provide slow release of nutrients into the plant over a 40-50 day time period, rather than the 4-10 day period of conventional fertilizers. This again proves to be beneficial economically, requiring less resources to be devoted to fertilizer transport, and less amount of total fertilizer needed. 

As expected with greater ability for nutrient uptake, crops have been found to exhibit greater health when using nanofertilizers over conventional ones. One study analyzed the effect of a potato-specific nano fertilizer composed of a variety of elements including K, P, N, and Mg, in comparison to a control group using their conventional counterparts. The study found that the potato crop which used the nano-fertilizer had an increased crop yield in comparison to the control, as well as more efficient water use and agronomic efficiency, defined as units of yield increased per unit of nutrient applied. In addition, the study found that the nano fertilized potatoes had a higher nutrient content, such as increased starch and ascorbic acid content. Another study analyzed the use of iron-based nanofertilizers in black eyed peas, and determined that root stability increased dramatically in the use of nano fertilizer, as well as chlorophyll content in leaves, thus improving photosynthesis. A different study found that zinc nanofertilizers enhanced photosynthesis rate in maize crops, measured through soluble carbohydrate concentration, likely as a result of the role of zinc in the photosynthesis process.

Much work needs to be done in the future to make nanofertilizers a consistent, viable alternative to conventional fertilizers. Effective legislation needs to be drafted regulating the use of nanofertilizers, drafting standards for consistent quality and targeted release of nutrients. Further, more studies need to be done to understand the full benefits and potential downsides of nanofertilizers, to gain the full picture in approach of using nanotechnology to benefit agriculture in an ever-changing world.

Nanotechnology in plant transformations

Nanotechnology has played a pivotal role in the field of genetic engineering and plant transformations, making it a desirable candidate in the optimization and manipulation of cultivated plants. In the past, most genetic modifications to plants have been done with Agrobacterium, or utilising tools such as the gene gun (biolistics); however, these older methods of gene implementation face roadblocks due to low species compatibility lack of versatility/compatibility with Chloroplastial/Mitochondrial gene transformations, and  potential for cell or organelle damage (due to impact of biolistics). While biolistics and Agrobacterium are useful in specific species of plants- more refined approaches are being explored through the utilisation of nanomaterials- allowing for a less invasive and forced delivery approach. These methods utilise Carbon Nanotube (CNT) and various porous nanoparticle (NP) enabled delivery methods, which may allow for higher-throughput plant transformation- while also circumventing legal GMO restrictions. The research of non-incorporative/DNA-Free genetic modifications has become a very important field of study, since traditional methods of plant transformation (agrobacterium and biolistics) risk DNA  incorporation in the plant genome, thus making them transgenic and qualifying them as a GMO.

A novel strategy utilizes highly-tailorable diffusion based nanocarriers for the delivery of genetic material, allowing for non-transgenic, non-destructive plant transformation. The method specificity is highly dependent on the properties of the material utilized, with key factors including size, polarity, and surface chemistry. Some approaches to diffusion based delivery have used Nano-Structured-DNA, carbon nanotubes, and other nanoparticles as vesicles for the delivery of genetic information. . These methods typically rely on functionalization of the surface or manipulation of porosity of a nanocarrier in order to optimize the loading and delivery of genetic information. DNA nanostructures have been shown to be a highly programmable modality in terms of delivery of small interfering RNA (siRNA), exploring the optimal design parameters necessary for plant cell internalization. A recent study utilizing DNA loaded CNTs was able to successfully express desired traits in various mature model plant systems- and even isolated Eruca sativa protoplasts while managing to protect and maintain the fidelity of the transferred genetic material.  Lastly, porous nanoparticles have been shown to be an effective DNA delivering agent for plant transformations- with efficiency depending on pore size and strand length. All in all, these diffusion based gene transformation methodologies offer a cheaper mode of plant gene transformation with lower impact to plant tissue, lower transformation efficiencies, and little to no risk of DNA incorporation.

Biolistics is the primary approach to plant transformation. The biolistic process involves launching microprojectiles (usually gold microparticles) carrying genetic information through the cell walls and membranes of cells to impart genetic transformation. As previously mentioned, biolistics may result in damaging the targeted cells or organelles- thus in order to minimize potential cell damage, nano-biolistic methods have been developed. Due to the significantly reduced size of the particle being launched into the cell, the impact can be minimized, while offering a similar efficiency of genetic transformation as traditional biolistics. However, most studies utilizing nanoscale biolistic approaches are done with animal cells, so implementation in plant transformation is still fairly novel and may encounter roadblocks unseen in animal cell studies.

Overall, nanotechnology provides a novel and competitive approach to genetic transformation of plants. Going forward, future research into the applications of these approaches will span a greater variety of crops, aim to utilize cheaper, more scalable methods, and explore potential environmental effects. Ultimately, once these design criteria will determine whether nanomaterial plant transformations will become a widespread practice in the future of agriculture.

Public opinion

In recent years, as applications of nanotechnology have exhibited promise in many fields of study, an increasing number of government, scientific, and independent institutional bodies have seen the potential of nanotechnology in making significant contributions to alleviating the burden of the global food supply. Current public views on nanotechnology development in the agricultural industry are mixed.  With consideration of the potential hazards in conjunction with the potential benefits, the current public opinion appears to be relatively neutral as critics see the technology as less risky, and more beneficial than a number of other technologies such as pesticides and chemical disinfectants; however, it is perceived as riskier and less beneficial than solar technologies and vaccinations.
	
Among the general public, there still exists negative connotations related to fertilizers and genetic modification of living organisms. Concerns that despite the benefit of higher yields and shorter growing cycles, fertilizers are associated with toxic runoff that contaminate sources of water and can lead to the generation of acid rain. Additionally, there exists the unfounded fear that consumption of genetically modified foods is 'unnatural' and dangerous , which has led to numerous legislative efforts- limiting the field to non-transgenic transformations. While the majority of public fears and concerns are unfounded, it is more the result of poor communication and lack of public awareness related to the issue of introducing novel technology to a traditional industry such as agriculture. Ultimately the production of clean and healthy food is considered by many to be of high importance, simply due to the high frequency of consumption and intimate relation people have with the food they consume.

References

agriculture
Agricultural technology